Jason Jozsa (born July 4, 1981) is a Canadian retired professional ice hockey defenceman.

Following four seasons (1999–2003) of NCAA hockey with the Colorado College Tigers, Jozsa turned professional with the 2003–04 season playing his rookie year with the Toledo Storm of the ECHL. During the 2007–08 campaign, Jozsa helped the ECHL's Las Vegas Wranglers reach the Kelly Cup Finals, and in 2009–10 he won the Kelly Cup as a member of the Cincinnati Cyclones.

Jozsa retired after the 2009–10 season, having skated in 371 ECHL games and 92 American Hockey League games over seven seasons of play.

References

External links

1981 births
Living people
Canadian ice hockey defencemen
Cincinnati Cyclones (ECHL) players
Colorado College Tigers men's ice hockey players
Grand Rapids Griffins players
Greenville Grrrowl players
Las Vegas Wranglers players
Milwaukee Admirals players
Mohawk Valley Comets players
Nanaimo Clippers players
Omaha Ak-Sar-Ben Knights players
Prince George Cougars players
Quad City Flames players
Ice hockey people from Calgary
Toledo Storm players